Lill Harriet Sandaune (born 27 October 1973) is a Norwegian politician for the Progress Party.

She has served as an elected member of Malvik municipal council and Sør-Trøndelag county council. In the 2009 and 2013 elections she was elected as a deputy representative to the Parliament of Norway from Sør-Trøndelag. When Per Sandberg became a member of Solberg's Cabinet, she moved up to regular representative.

She hails from Hommelvik and works as a teacher at Skjetlein Upper Secondary School.

References

1973 births
Living people
People from Malvik
BI Norwegian Business School alumni
Progress Party (Norway) politicians
Sør-Trøndelag politicians
Members of the Storting
Women members of the Storting
Norwegian schoolteachers